The 2019–20 season was the 51st season of the competitive association football in Australia.

Most events from March 2020 onwards were disrupted or postponed due to impacts from the COVID-19 pandemic in Australia.

National teams

Australia men's national soccer team

2022 FIFA World Cup qualification / 2023 AFC Asian Cup qualification

Second round

Australia men's national under-23 soccer team

Friendlies
The following is a list of friendlies played by the men's under 23 national team in 2019–20.

2020 AFC U-23 Championship
Matches also acted as qualification for the 2020 Olympic Games .

Australia men's national under-20 soccer team

AFF U-18 Youth Championship

AFC U-19 Championship qualification

Australia men's national under-17 soccer team

Friendlies
The following is a list of friendlies played by the men's under 17 national team in 2019–20.

FIFA U-17 World Cup

Younger cohort: AFF U-15 Youth Championship

Younger cohort: AFC U-16 Championship qualification

Australia women's national soccer team

Friendlies
The following is a list of friendlies played or originally scheduled to be played by the women's senior national team in 2019–20.

2020 AFC Women's Olympic Qualifying Tournament

Australia women's national under-20 soccer team

AFC U-19 Women's Championship

Australia women's national under-17 soccer team

Friendlies
The following is a list of friendlies played by the women's under 17 national team in 2019–20.

AFC U-16 Women's Championship

AFC competitions

AFC Champions League

Group stage

Group E

Group F

Group H

Knockout stage

Round of 16

|}

Men's football

A-League

Finals series

Elimination-finals

Semi-finals

Grand final

National Premier Leagues

The Final Series featured the winner of each Member Federation's league competition in the National Premier Leagues, where the overall winner was to qualify directly for the 2020 FFA Cup Round of 32. Since that competition was cancelled, Wollongong Wolves qualified directly for the 2021 FFA Cup Round of 32.

Cup competitions

FFA Cup

Final

Women's football

W-League

Finals series

Deaths
 14 September 2019: Rudi Gutendorf, 93, Australian head coach from 1979 to 1981.
 28 November 2019: Pim Verbeek, 63, Australian head coach from 2007 to 2010.
 27 May 2020: Liesbeth Migchelsen, 49, Canberra United head coach from 2013 to 2014.

Retirements
 2 July 2019: Marc Janko, 36, former Austria and Sydney FC striker.
 15 July 2019: Lizzie Durack, 25, former England and Western Sydney Wanderers goalkeeper.
15 September 2019: Daniel McBreen, 42, former Newcastle United, North Queensland Fury, Perth Glory and Central Coast Mariners striker.
10 October 2019: Caitlin Munoz, 36, former Australia and Canberra United striker.
18 October 2019: Ken Ilsø, 33, former Adelaide United striker.
1 January 2020: David Villa, 38, former Spain and Melbourne City striker.
6 January 2020: Erika Tymrak, 28, former United States and Melbourne City midfielder.
28 January 2020: Alexander Meier, 37, former Western Sydney Wanderers forward.
6 May 2020: Jakob Poulsen, 36, former Denmark and Melbourne Victory midfielder.
14 May 2020: Marcos Flores, 34, former Adelaide United, Melbourne Victory, Central Coast Mariners, Newcastle Jets and Adelaide City midfielder.
26 May 2020: Alex Cisak, 31, former Sydney FC goalkeeper.
18 June 2020: Glen Moss, 37, former New Zealand, Sydney Olympic, New Zealand Knights, Wellington Phoenix, Melbourne Victory, Gold Coast United, and Newcastle Jets goalkeeper.

References

External links
 Football Federation Australia official website

2019 in Australian soccer
2020 in Australian soccer
Seasons in Australian soccer
2019–20 in Australian women's soccer